Sasha Sybille Rionda Hogger (born September 29, 1977, in Mexico City, Mexico) is a Mexican  actress and television hostess.

As a child actress, she is most probably remembered as the mutant child psychic who correctly guesses the birthday of Arnold Schwarzenegger's character Quaid in the 1990 sci-fi film Total Recall.

Rionda currently resides in Atlanta, Georgia. She is the on air anchor of Local Now conducting national news and entertainment segments and providing occasional field reports.

You can also see her in the weekly show Coffee with America where she brings you up to speed on what's brewing in news, social media and pop culture.

Previously she hosted Detalles con Sasha on CNN Español. She was also the anchor and reporter of a Spanish-language news program named Nuestro Rincón on WKRC-TV, aimed at the hispanic community of Cincinnati, Ohio, where she resided from 2004 to 2008. 
She also was host of Cinecanal's "Zoom".
Back in 2001, she hosted a program named The Music Room for CNN International.

Selected filmography
 Total Recall (1990) – Mutant child
 Wild On! – hosted installment Wild On the Beach Australia
 The Devil to Pay (2002)
 Coffee with America (2015 – present) – host

External links
 
 

Living people
Mexican actresses
Actresses from Mexico City
Mexican people of Swiss descent
Mexican emigrants to the United States
1977 births